MSOR can mean:

 Marine Special Operations Regiment (United States)
 Maths, Stats & OR Network